Since confederation in 1867 through to the contemporary era, decadal and demi-decadal census reports in Canada have compiled detailed immigration statistics. During this period, the highest annual immigration rate in Canada occurred in 1913, when 400,900 new immigrants accounted for 5.3 percent of the total population, while the greatest number of immigrants admitted to Canada in single year occurred in 2022, with 437,120 persons accounting for 1.1 percent of the total population.

In a linear timeline following initial British and French colonization, what is now Canada has seen four major waves (or peaks) of immigration and settlement of non-Indigenous Peoples take place over a span of nearly two centuries. Canada is currently undergoing its fifth wave.

Annual immigration and rate 
Since confederation in 1867, the highest annual immigration rate in Canada occurred during the early 20th century, including 1913 (new immigrants accounted for 5.3 percent of the total population), 1912 (5.1 percent), 1911 (4.6 percent), 1907 (4.3 percent) and 1910 (4.1 percent). At this time, immigration from the British Isles increased, supplemented by a rapid increase in immigration flows from continental Europe, especially Germany, Scandinavia, and the Soviet Union.

Sources of immigration 
Canada receives its immigrant population from almost 200 countries. Statistics Canada projects that immigrants will represent between 29.1% and 34.0% of Canada's population in 2041, compared with 23.0% in 2021, while the Canadian population with at least one foreign born parent (first and second generation persons) could rise to between 49.8% and 54.3%, up from 44.0% in 2021. The number of visible ethno-cultural composition of population will double and make up the minority of the population of cities in Canada.

2021 census 
The 2021 census reported that immigrants comprised 8,361,505 individuals or 23.0 percent of the total Canadian population. Of the total immigrant population, the top countries of origin were India (898,045 persons or 10.7%), Philippines (719,580 persons or 8.6%), China (715,835 persons or 8.6%),  United Kingdom (464,135 persons or 5.6%), United States (256,085 persons or 3.1%), Pakistan (234,110 persons or 2.8%), Hong Kong (213,855 persons or 2.6%), Italy (204,065 persons or 2.4%), Iran (182,940 persons or 2.2%), and Vietnam (182,095 persons or 2.2%).

2016 census 
The 2016 census reported that immigrants comprised 7,540,830 individuals or 21.9 percent of the total Canadian population. Of the total immigrant population, the top countries of origin were India (668,565 persons or 8.9%), China (649,260 persons or 8.6%), Philippines (588,305 persons or 7.8%), United Kingdom (499,120 persons or 6.6%), United States (253,715 persons or 3.4%), Italy (236,635 persons or 3.1%), Hong Kong (208,935 persons or 2.8%), Pakistan (202,255 persons or 2.7%), Vietnam (169,250 persons or 2.2%), and Iran (154,420 persons or 2.1%).

2011 census 
The 2011 census reported that immigrants comprised 6,775,765 individuals or 20.6 percent of the total Canadian population. Of the total immigrant population, the top countries of origin were India (547,890	persons or 8.1 percent), China (545,535 5persons or 8.1 percent), United Kingdom (537,040 persons or 7.9 percent), Philippines (454,340 persons or 6.7 percent), United States (263,475 persons or 3.9 percent), Italy (256,825 persons or 3.8 percent), Hong Kong (205,430 persons or 3.0 percent), Vietnam (165,125 persons or 2.5 percent), Pakistan (156,860 persons or 2.3 percent), and Germany (152,345 persons or 2.3 percent).

2006 census 
The 2006 census reported that immigrants comprised 6,186,950 individuals or 19.8 percent of the total Canadian population. Of the total immigrant population, the top countries of origin were United Kingdom (579,620 persons or 9.4%), China (466,940 persons or 7.6%), India (443,690 persons or 7.2%), Philippines (303,195 persons or 4.9%), Italy (296,850 persons or 4.8%), United States (250,535 persons or 4.1%), Hong Kong (215,430 persons or 3.5%), Germany (171,405 persons or 2.8%), Poland (170,490 persons or 2.8%), and Vietnam (160,170 persons or 2.6%).

2001 census 
The 2001 census reported that immigrants comprised 5,448,480 individuals or 18.4 percent of the total Canadian population. Of the total immigrant population, the top countries of origin were United Kingdom (605,995 persons or 11.1%), China (332,825 persons or 6.1%), Italy (315,455 persons or 5.8%), India (314,690 persons or 5.8%), United States (237,920 persons or 4.4%), Hong Kong (235,620 persons or 4.3%), Philippines (232,670 persons or 4.3%), Poland (180,415 persons or 3.3%), Germany (174,070 persons or 3.2%), and Portugal (153,535 persons or 2.8%).

1971 census

1961 census

1951 census

1941 census

1931 census

1921 census

1911 census

1901 census

1891 census

1881 census

1871 census

Annual sources of immigration

2020s 
 
The 437,120 permanent residents (immigrants) admitted in 2022 was alongside approximately 137,800 Ukrainians arriving during the year, the vast majority of which were not counted in the official immigration statistics for the year, instead arriving under temporary resident visas.

2010s

1950s

See also 

Immigration to Canada
History of immigration to Canada
Population of Canada by year

Notes

References 

Immigration to Canada
 
Human migration
Post-Confederation Canada (1867–1914)
Canada in the World Wars and Interwar Years
History of Canada (1945–1960)
History of Canada (1960–1981)
History of Canada (1982–1992)
History of Canada (1992–present)
Multiculturalism in Canada